Alfonzo Feliciano Gotladera (born February 16, 1992) is a Filipino professional basketball player who last played for the San Miguel Beermen of the Philippine Basketball Association (PBA). He was selected by the NLEX Road Warriors in the 2016 PBA draft.

Career statistics

PBA season-by-season averages
As of the end of 2021 season
|-
| align=left | 
| align="left" rowspan="2" | NLEX
| 9 || 7.6 || .467 || – || .200 || 1.0 || .2 || .1 || .1 || 1.7
|-
| align=left | 
| 20 || 6.9 || .439 || .000 || .500 || 2.0 || .5 || .2 || .1 || 1.9
|-
| align=left | 
| align="left" | San Miguel
| 12 || 3.5 || .333 || – || .750 || 1.0 || .2 || .0 || .0 || .6
|- class="sortbottom"
| style="text-align:center;" colspan="2"|Career
| 41 || 6.0 || .435 || .000 || .455 || 1.5 || .3 || .1 || .0 || 1.4

UAAP 

|-
| align="left" | 2011–12
| align="left"; rowspan=2| La Salle
| 8 || 3.8 || .167 || .000 || .000 || 1.3 || .0 || .0 || .3 || .3
|-
| align="left" | 2012–13
| 5 || 3.6 || .000 || .000 || .000 || 1.0 || .0 || .0 || .0 || .0
|-
| align="left" | 2014–15
| align="left"; rowspan=2| Ateneo
| 16 || 16.6 || .523 || .000 || .486 || 5.3 || .4 || .2 || 1.0 || 5.3
|-
| align="left" | 2015–16
| 13 || 17.0 || .510 || .000 || .412 || 6.0 || .9 || .1 || .1 || 4.4
|-class=sortbottom
| align="center" colspan=2 | Career
| 42 || 12.7 || .484 || .000 || .453 || 4.2 || .4 || .1 || .5 || 3.4

International career
He was part of the Gilas team that competed in the 2016 FIBA Asia Challenge.

References

External links
 
 
 

1992 births
Living people
Basketball players from Metro Manila
Centers (basketball)
NLEX Road Warriors players
People from San Juan, Metro Manila
Philippine Basketball Association All-Stars
Philippines men's national basketball team players
Filipino men's basketball players
Power forwards (basketball)
San Beda University alumni
Ateneo Blue Eagles men's basketball players
Maharlika Pilipinas Basketball League players
De La Salle Green Archers basketball players
NLEX Road Warriors draft picks
San Miguel Beermen players
Filipino men's 3x3 basketball players
PBA 3x3 players